Saint-Germain-sur-Avre is a commune in the Eure department in Normandy in north western France.

Population

See also
Communes of the Eure department

References

Communes of Eure